"Imma Star (Everywhere We Are)" is a song by the American R&B recording artist Jeremih. It is the second single released from his first album, Jeremih. The music video was released in July 2009 and was directed by Marc Klasfeld.

Music video
The video shows Jeremih searching for a job and going around town to impress others, in attempts to show he is rich. He fails and others are disgusted by him. During the video he is seen flirting with a girl. He invites her into his car, where they watch a television that has been taped to the back of the headrest. He takes her to a club where he unsuccessfully attempts to bribe the bouncer with coins. After being rejected, they head to a drive-thru fast-food chain, where Jerimih buys his companion a half-eaten hot dog (the saleswoman eats half of it, as collateral for him not being able to pay for a full one.) Disgusted by this, his date leaves him at the drive-thru. The video finishes with Jeremih waking up to the fact that his follies were just a dream, and that he is indeed wealthy.

The video was ranked at #89 on BET's Notarized: Top 100 Videos of 2009 countdown.

Chart performance
"Imma Star (Everywhere We Are)" debuted at number 96 on the Billboard Hot 100 the week of August 8, 2009. Seven weeks later, it peaked at number 51 the week of September 26, and stayed on the chart for twenty weeks.

Weekly charts

Year-end charts

Certifications

References

2009 singles
Jeremih songs
Music videos directed by Marc Klasfeld
Def Jam Recordings singles
2009 songs
Songs written by Mick Schultz
Songs written by Jeremih